The 1968 Roller Hockey World Cup was the eighteenth roller hockey world cup, organized by the Fédération Internationale de Roller Sports. It was contested by 10 national teams (6 from Europe, 1 from South America, 1 from North America, 1 from Asia and 1 from Oceania, for the first time ever). All the games were played in the city of Porto, in Portugal, the chosen city to host the World Cup.

Results

Standings

See also
 FIRS Roller Hockey World Cup

External links
 1968 World Cup in rink-hockey.net historical database

Roller Hockey World Cup
International roller hockey competitions hosted by Portugal
1968 in Portuguese sport
1968 in roller hockey